Kendall Ellis (born March 8, 1996) is an American sprinter. Ellis won gold in the 4x400 m relay and bronze in the Mixed 4x400 metres at the Tokyo Olympics. She competed in the 400 meters at the 2017 and 2019 World Championships, winning gold medals as a part of prelim 4×400 m relays. As a junior, Ellis took gold in the 4×400 m relay and bronze in the 400 meters at the 2015 Pan American Junior Championships.

On June 10, 2018, she gained widespread distinction after her come from behind victory in the 1600 meter relay at the NCAA Track and Field Championships. She caught Purdue's Jaheya Mitchel at the finish line, giving University of Southern California the team event and its second women's track and field national title in program history. Ellis is a 3-time NCAA champion, 14-time NCAA Division I All-American, 7-time Pac-12 Conference champion and 5-time Mountain Pacific Sports Federation champion. Ellis set 2 NCAA indoor track and field records, a North American, Central American and Caribbean Athletic Association indoor 400 meters record and United States collegiate records in 400 m and 4 x 400 m relay.

Career
Ellis won gold in the 4x400 m relay and bronze in the Mixed 4x400 metres (participating in the prelims) at the Tokyo Olympics.

She placed 4th in the 400 m at the 2020 U.S. Olympic Trials with a time of 50.10 secs.

Ellis competed in the women's 400 metres and won gold in the 4x400 m relay (participating in the prelim) at the 2019 World Athletics Championships.

In January 2019, she was announced to sign with New Balance and won her professional debut later that week at New Balance Indoor Grand Prix.

Ellis competed in the women's 400 metres and won gold in the 2017 World Championships in Athletics – Women's 4 × 400 metres relay (participating in the prelim) at the 2017 World Championships in Athletics. Ellis competed in 2015 Pan American Junior Athletics Championships and won gold in the 4×400 m relay and bronze in the 400 meters.

Ellis is 2015 USA U20 Outdoor Track and Field 400 m women Champion.

NCAA
Ellis is a 3-time NCAA champion, 14-time NCAA Division I All-American, 7-time Pac-12 Conference champion and 5-time Mountain Pacific Sports Federation champion. Ellis is the current North America, Central American and Caribbean record, American and Collegiate Record Holder for the indoor 400-meter dash with a time of 50.34 seconds.

Early life and prep
Ellis grew up volunteering at the West Pembroke Pines Optimist Track Club. 

Ellis works with children as a volunteer for Coaching Corps.

Ellis graduated from St. Thomas Aquinas High School (Florida) c/o 2014 as a 7-time FHSAA state champion with high school personal best times of 24.18 (200 meters) and 52.95 (400 meters).

Ellis was St. Thomas Aquinas High School (Florida) teammates / relay partner with IAAF World U 18 and U 20 medalist Khalifa St. Fort.

In 2014, Ellis placed 1st in the 400 m (52.95) and 1st in the 4x400 m (3:41.01) at Florida High School Athletic Association 4A state meet.

In 2013, Ellis placed 1st in the 400 m (54.96), 6th in the 200 m (24.45) and 1st in the 4x400 m (3:45.01) at Florida High School Athletic Association 4A state meet.

In 2012, Ellis placed 1st in the 400 m (53.22), 5th in the 200 m (24.93) and 1st in the 4x400 m (3:47.67) at Florida High School Athletic Association 4A state meet.

In 2011, Ellis placed 1st in the 400 m (54.83), 9th in the 200 m (24.88) and 1st in the 4x400 m (3:51.67) at Florida High School Athletic Association 4A state meet.

References

External links
 
 
 
 
 
 Kendall Ellis at USC Trojans
 
 Kendall Ellis at NBC Sports

1996 births
Living people
American female sprinters
World Athletics Championships athletes for the United States
World Athletics Championships medalists
World Athletics Championships winners
Sportspeople from Pembroke Pines, Florida
Track and field athletes from Florida
USC Trojans women's track and field athletes
University of Southern California alumni
St. Thomas Aquinas High School (Florida) alumni
Athletes (track and field) at the 2020 Summer Olympics
Medalists at the 2020 Summer Olympics
Olympic gold medalists for the United States in track and field
Olympic bronze medalists for the United States in track and field
21st-century American women